Quentin Dolmaire (born 18 February 1994) is a French actor. He was nominated for the César Award for Most Promising Actor in 2016 for his role in My Golden Days.

Biography
Dolmaire, having played theatre since the age of ten, quit his physics studies, in order to follow acting courses at Cours Simon. He was only in his second course when he was approached by the director Arnaud Desplechin for the role of Paul Dédalus in My Golden Days, the sequel to My Sex Life... or How I Got into an Argument. Dolmaire plays the adolescent version of the character in the movie, whilst Mathieu Amalric plays the elder.

Filmography

References

French male film actors
21st-century French male actors
20th-century French male actors
1994 births
Living people